Boulevard is a biannual literary magazine. It has been called "one of the half-dozen best literary journals" by Poet Laureate Daniel Hoffman in The Philadelphia Inquirer.

History
The magazine was established in 1985 by Richard Burgin, who served as editor-in-chief through 2015. In 1991 the magazine began to be published by Drexel University in Philadelphia where Richard Burgin taught. In the fall of 1996, Burgin moved to St. Louis and St. Louis University became its publisher, until the magazine became independent in 2013.

Poet Charles Simic has called it one of the eight best literary magazines in America. In a 2003 interview, Burgin said, "My suspicion, especially of many MFA writers, is that they are writing what they think will get published and are not sufficiently interested in exploring the form. [...] In Boulevard's slush pile, I find very little experimentation in form and structure. The stuff is tame. I see very little experimentation in point of view, in language. The subject matter is generally politically correct. Political correctness is the most noxious disease and enemy of the literary artist of our current time."

Honors and awards
The magazine has won city, state, and national grants and awards. Many poems, stories and essays are reprinted in anthologies such as The Best American Poetry series, The Best American Short Stories, The Pushcart Prize, The PEN/O. Henry Prize Stories, and The Best American Essays.

References

External links

1985 establishments in Pennsylvania
Biannual magazines published in the United States
Literary magazines published in the United States
Magazines established in 1985
Magazines published in Philadelphia
Magazines published in St. Louis
Saint Louis University